Keith A. Bee (born December 5, 1965) is a former member of the Arizona House of Representatives and the Arizona State Senate. He served in the State House from January 1991 through January 1993. He then served in the State Senate from January 1993 through January 2001, representing district 9. The amendment to the Arizona Constitution which limited politicians to serving four consecutive terms in either house was passed in 1992, preventing Bee from running again in November 2000. He was succeeded in office by his brother Timothy. In 2002, Bee was an unsuccessful candidate in the Republican primary for Arizona Superintendent of Public Instruction.

Senator Bee then was appointed Justice of the Peace Bee in 2007. Bee faced an election challenge from Wesley Kent for the September 2, 2008 primary and, initially lost. He took the case to the Arizona Supreme Court & prevailed. Bee was not running for reelection in 2018 but abruptly resigned on Friday 4 August 2018. It was reported the next week that the early retirement was likely triggered by a four-count indictment of filing false statements on three years' of tax returns for his business, Bee Line Bus Transportation.   Bee was scheduled for a change-of-plea hearing on 27 August 2021.

Bee then pled Guilty to Count 3 of the Indictment- that,  on 15 October 2014,  he filed a false 1040 Internal Revenue Form. The falsity occurred because Bee stated $4,441,113 in business expenses. The declaration included his personal expenses & depreciation of personal assets as if they were Bee Line Transportation assets & he did not believe that to be true and correct. Bee's sentencing was set for 9 November; however, on the 8th of October the parties filed a stipulation to vacate & reset the sentencing “…to resolve issues relative to his obligations to the IRS, including the agreed-upon restitution, and needs additional time regarding these matters prior to sentencing.  This additional time is also needed to make arrangements, which include liquidation of assets to provide funds, so that, minimally, payment can be made on the IRS obligation/restitution prior to the sentencing date…”

On 29 November Defense Counsel Michael Piccarreta and Assistant United States Attorney David R. Zipps stipulated to a second continued sentencing. The prior justifications of 8 October were raised anew plus now Mr. Piccarreta included a conflict. Piccarreta was defending a Maricopa County Superior Court 10-day vehicular murder case with a firm trial date from 15 February 2022. Finally, the defense wanted sufficient time to adequately raise objections to the Presentence Investigation Report. The stipulation was accepted by Judge James Soto. The new  sentencing date was set for 16 March 2022 at 3:00 p.m. with the deadline for objections to the Presentence Investigation Report set at 14 January 2022. The government had a deadline of 11 February 2022 to file responses to the objections.  Bee was facing up to 10 months of prison or home confinement and pyaing $343,000 in restitution to the Internal Revenue Service. Arizona Republic 31 August 2021.

On 16 March 2022, Bee was sentenced by U.S. District Judge James A. Soto to six months in federal prison, and a year of supervised probation after his release. He must pay $343,000 in restitution and interest. Although records show Bee owns real estate with an assessed value of more than $3 million, his attorney described him as "indigent" and the judge waived a potential fine of $250,000, finding that he "does not have the ability to pay."

References

Republican Party Arizona state senators
Republican Party members of the Arizona House of Representatives
1965 births
Living people
Politicians from Tucson, Arizona